The 3rd Africa Movie Academy Awards ceremony was held on March 10, 2007 at the Gloryland Cultural Center in Yenagoa, Bayelsa State, Nigeria, to honor the best African films of 2006. The ceremony was broadcast live on Nigerian national television. Numerous African & international celebrities and top Nigerian politicians attended the event, including Nigerian musician Tuface Idibia and Ghanaian hiplife band VIP. Nollywood actor Richard Mofe-Damijo and South African actress Thami Ngubeni hosted the ceremony. Special guests of honor were Academy Award winners Cuba Gooding, Jr. and Mo'Nique. Nollywood's favourite acting duo Osita Iheme and Chinedu Ikedieze received the Lifetime Achievement Award.

Winners

Major Awards 
The winners of the 19 Award Categories are listed first and highlighted in bold letters.

Additional awards

Films with multiple nominations
The following films received multiple nominations.

11 nominations
Abeni
The Amazing Grace
9 nominations
Sitanda
7 nominations
Apesin
4 nominations
Mokili

3 nominations
Azima
Iwalewa
Explosion
Maroko
Covenant Church
2 nominations
Sins of the Flesh
Beyonce: The President's Daughter
Bunny Chow
Dancing Heart

Films with multiple awards
The following films received multiple awards.
5 awards
Sitanda
3 awards
Abeni
2 awards
Sins of the Flesh

References

Africa Movie Academy Awards
Africa Movie Academy Awards
Africa Movie Academy Awards ceremonies
Award
Africa Movie Academy Awards